is an original Japanese anime television series animated by Liden Films, directed by migimi and written by Kimiko Ueno, with the original concept credited to the real-life Manpuku Geinō Production. The series premiered in October 2022 on Fuji TV. A manga adaptation by Chansana began serialization in Media Factory's shōjo manga magazine Monthly Comic Gene in April 2022.

Characters

Gentlemen

Story of Love

Media

Manga
A manga adaptation with art by Chansana began serialization in Media Factory's shōjo manga magazine Monthly Comic Gene on April 15, 2022. A single volume has been released as of November 2022.

Anime
The original anime television series was announced on March 16, 2022. The series is animated by Liden Films and directed by migimi, with scripts written by Kimiko Ueno and the original concept credited to the real-life Manpuku Geinō Production. Original character designs are provided by ma2, while Seiko Asai adapts the designs for animation. The music is composed by Yukari Hashimoto, and the sound is directed by Ryō Tanaka. It premiered on October 11, 2022 on Fuji TV. The opening theme song is "Dreamy Life" by Gentlemen, while the ending theme song is "Friends" by Story of Love. Sentai Filmworks licensed the series, and will begin streaming it on Hidive on March 19, 2023.

Game
An otome game developed by Coly titled  will be released in 2023.

References

External links
Anime official website 
Game official website 

Anime with original screenplays
Fuji TV original programming
Japan-exclusive video games
Japanese idols in anime and manga
Liden Films
Media Factory manga
Otome games
Sentai Filmworks
Shōjo manga
Upcoming video games scheduled for 2023
Video games developed in Japan